Tomass Dukurs (born 2 July 1981 in Riga) is a Latvian skeleton racer who has competed since 1998. Competing in three Winter Olympics, he finished fourth in the men's skeleton event at Vancouver in 2010 and Sochi in 2014.

Career
Dukurs' best finish at the FIBT World Championships was 3rd in the men's skeleton event at Winterberg in 2015.

His younger brother Martins is also a skeleton racer. Both he and his brother made the 2010 Winter Olympics and the 2014 Winter Olympics.

In November 2017 Sochi gold medalist Alexander Tretiakov was disqualified by the IOC and his medal stripped from him, however, a decision on, whether Tomass Dukurs is granted a bronze medal, has not been made by the IBSF. Eventually, IBSF restored the gold medal for Tretiakov.

Tomass and Martins are coached by their father, Dainis Dukurs, a former bobsleigh brakeman, manager of the Sigulda sledding track and sled designer.

Career results

Skeleton World Cup

References
 2002 men's skeleton results
 
 Skeletonsport.com profile

1981 births
Living people
Latvian male skeleton racers
Olympic skeleton racers of Latvia
Riga State Gymnasium No.1 alumni
Skeleton racers at the 2002 Winter Olympics
Skeleton racers at the 2010 Winter Olympics
Skeleton racers at the 2014 Winter Olympics
Skeleton racers at the 2018 Winter Olympics
Skeleton racers at the 2022 Winter Olympics
Sportspeople from Riga
20th-century Latvian people
21st-century Latvian people